Einar Karlsson (1 August 1909 – 23 October 1967) was a Swedish football forward who played for Gårda BK and Team Sweden.

References

1909 births
1967 deaths
Swedish footballers
Sweden international footballers
Association football forwards
Gårda BK players